The Norman Fucking Rockwell! Tour was the fifth headlining concert tour by American singer Lana Del Rey, in support of her sixth studio album, Norman Fucking Rockwell! (2019). The tour began at the Jones Beach Theater in Wantagh, New York on September 21, 2019, and concluded at the Du Arena in Abu Dhabi, United Arab Emirates on November 30 of the same year.

The tour consisted of 19 shows in North America, and one in Asia. The tour was expected to continue in 2020, with a set of shows held Europe, Latin America and a few in North America, but the European leg of the tour was cancelled after Del Rey fell ill, while the rest of the shows were cancelled due to the COVID-19 pandemic. The Norman Fucking Rockwell! Tour grossed of $2,479,294, with an attendance of 36,096 from seven reported shows.

Background 
On July 31, 2019 Del Rey announced that her sixth studio album Norman Fucking Rockwell! would be released on August 30. The following day, she announced that the album's release would be followed by a tour.

The stops for the first leg of the tour were be primarily along the west coast of North America, with a few stops in major cities elsewhere in Canada and the United States. On September 16, 2019, Del Rey confirmed on radio 102.7KIISFM, that the tour would have four legs. The first leg would take place in the West Coast of North America during fall 2019, while the second leg would be in Europe during winter 2020. The third leg took place in the Midwest of North America in November 2019 with a final show in Abu Dhabi. The fourth leg, would consist of Southeastern U.S. states like Tennessee, Alabama, and Florida as well as festival shows in Europe and South America from March to June 2020, was eventually cancelled.

Set list 
This set list is representative of the September 30, 2019 show in Vancouver. It does not represent all dates throughout the tour.

 "Norman Fucking Rockwell"
 "Bartender"
 "For Free" 
 "Mariners Apartment Complex"
 "Born to Die"
 "Blue Jeans"
 "White Mustang"
 "Cherry"
 "Pretty When You Cry"
 "Change" / "Black Beauty" / "Young and Beautiful" / "Ride"
 "Video Games"
 "Summertime Sadness"
 "Doin' Time" 
 "Off to the Races"
 "Shades of Cool"
 "Venice Bitch"

Shows

Cancelled shows

Notes

References

Lana Del Rey concert tours
2019 concert tours
Concert tours cancelled due to the COVID-19 pandemic
Concert tours of North America
Concert tours of Asia
Concert tours of the United States
Concert tours of Canada
Concert tours of the United Arab Emirates